Manadath Kunju Mackar Pillay (1880 – 1966) was an Indian industrialist, banker, philanthropist, and politician who served in the Sree Moolam Popular Assembly. He was a leading cashew and lemongrass exporter, and founder of the eponymous Mackar Pillay and Sons Limited.   

Pillay was the promoter of the Bank of Alwaye, Alwaye Municipality's primary financial institution, before it was merged into the State Bank of Travancore in 1965.

Biography 
Mackar Pillay was born to Manadath Kunju, an Aluva agriculturalist and trader, as the second of three sons.

In 1941, Pillay founded Mackar Pillay & Sons, one of the largest trading firms in the Kingdom of Travancore. The company was the first to challenge the monopoly of British trading firms in the Malabar coast by directly exporting essential oils.

Pillay's older brother, M. K. Khader Pillay was the first President of the Alwaye Municipality, which was chartered in 1921. Khader Pillay was also bestowed the Khan Sahib title by the British Raj for his service during the Great Flood of 99.

Philanthropy 
Mackar Pillay was instrumental in the establishment of co-operatives that strengthened Aluva's local economy, including the Keezhmad Khadi and Village Industries Co-operative Society, and the Keezhmad Co-operative Bank. 

Pillay was also a proponent of the education of Muslim women. He presented a considerable scholarship endowment to the Aligarh Muslim University for funding the education of the institution's female students.

Namesakes 

 MES M. K. Mackar Pillay College of Advanced Studies, Edathala
 M. K. Mackar Pillay Pay-ward at the Aluva Government Hospital

Descendants 

 M. M. Abdul Hameed - industrialist, philanthropist, and final managing director of Mackar Pillay & Sons Limited
Naureen Hassan - chief executive officer of UBS Americas; former first vice president and chief operating officer of the Federal Reserve Bank of New York

References

Indian industrialists
20th-century Indian businesspeople
Businesspeople from Kerala
People from Aluva
Members of the Sree Moolam Popular Assembly
Manadath family
1880 births
1966 deaths
Indian Muslims
Businesspeople in British India